

The Karyakshama Seva Padakkama (KSP, Efficient Service Medal) (Sinhala: කාර්යක්ෂම සේවා පදක්කම kāryakṣama sēvā padakkama) is a service medal awarded by the Military of Sri Lanka to all servicepersons of the Sri Lanka Army Volunteer Force in recognition of "...long, meritorious, loyal and valuable service of proven capacity". Established on 7 January 1986, the medal does not confer any individual precedence.

The KSP replaced the British Efficiency Medal in 1972 (awarded to volunteer other ranks of the Ceylon Army).

Award process
All Sri Lanka Army Volunteer Force servicepersons at the rank of Warrant Officer and below who, by or after 22 May 1972, have completed 18 years of service with an excellent record are eligible for award of the medal. Recipients are entitled to use the post-nominal letters "KSP".

References

Army, Sri Lanka. (1st Edition - October 1999). "50 YEARS ON" - 1949-1999, Sri Lanka Army.

External links
Sri Lanka Army
Ministry of Defence : Sri Lanka

Military awards and decorations of Sri Lanka
Awards established in 1986
Long service medals
1986 establishments in Sri Lanka